Abryna affinis is a species of beetle in the family Cerambycidae. It was described by Stephan von Breuning in 1938. It is found in the Philippines.

References

Pteropliini
Beetles described in 1938
Taxa named by Stephan von Breuning (entomologist)